Charles Edgar Thompson (c. 1896 – c. 1965) was a rugby union player who represented Australia.

Thompson, a prop, was born in Sydney and claimed a total of 6 international rugby caps for Australia.

References

Australian rugby union players
Australia international rugby union players
Year of birth uncertain
Rugby union players from Sydney
Rugby union props